Spring Lake is a village in the town of Coventry, Rhode Island.

The Johnson family were early owners of the land in the area, and in 1818 sold the property to Ezra Ramsdell to build a warp thread mill along the Spring Lake River (Mishnock River). Mill housing was constructed along the highway from Washington Village to the Maple Root Meeting House. After the mill burned in 1830, Christopher A. Whitman acquired the land and constructed a mill known as Whitmans’ Yard, which produced shirting material.

In 1852, Whitman leased the complex to Pardon Olney; it operated for another thirty years. In 1865, the Peckham family bought the mill, and ran it until it burned around 1907. Today, the area where the mill village once stood is populated with private businesses.

References

Villages in Kent County, Rhode Island
Coventry, Rhode Island
Census-designated places in Kent County, Rhode Island
Providence metropolitan area
Villages in Rhode Island
Census-designated places in Rhode Island
1818 establishments in Rhode Island